Alpha-adrenergic agonists are a class of sympathomimetic agents that selectively stimulates alpha adrenergic receptors. The alpha-adrenergic receptor has two subclasses α1 and α2. Alpha 2 receptors are associated with sympatholytic properties. Alpha-adrenergic agonists have the opposite function of alpha blockers. Alpha adrenoreceptor ligands mimic the action of epinephrine and norepinephrine signaling in the heart, smooth muscle and central nervous system, with norepinephrine being the highest affinity. The activation of α1 stimulates the membrane bound enzyme phospholipase C, and activation of α2 inhibits the enzyme adenylate cyclase. Inactivation of adenylate cyclase in turn leads to the inactivation of the secondary messenger cyclic adenosine monophosphate and induces smooth muscle and blood vessel constriction.

Classes

Although complete selectivity between receptor agonism is rarely achieved, some agents have partial selectivity. NB: the inclusion of a drug in each category just indicates the activity of the drug at that receptor, not necessarily the selectivity of the drug (unless otherwise noted).

α1 agonist

α1 agonist: stimulates phospholipase C activity. (vasoconstriction and mydriasis; used as vasopressors, nasal decongestants and during eye exams). Selected examples are:
 Methoxamine 
 Midodrine
 Metaraminol
 Phenylephrine
Amidephrine
Sdz-nvi-085 [104195-17-7].

α2 agonist

α2 agonist: inhibits adenylyl cyclase activity, reduces brainstem vasomotor center-mediated CNS activation; used as antihypertensive, sedative & treatment of opiate dependence and alcohol withdrawal symptoms). Selected examples are:
 Clonidine (mixed alpha2-adrenergic and imidazoline-I1 receptor agonist)
 Dexmedetomidine
 Fadolmidine
 Guanfacine, (preference for alpha2A-subtype of adrenoceptor)
 Guanabenz (most selective agonist for alpha2-adrenergic as opposed to imidazoline-I1)
 Guanoxabenz (metabolite of guanabenz)
 Guanethidine (peripheral alpha2-receptor agonist)
 Xylazine,
 Tizanidine
 Methyldopa
 Methylnorepinephrine 
 Norepinephrine
 (R)-3-nitrobiphenyline is an α2C selective agonist as well as being a weak antagonist at the α and α subtypes.
amitraz
Detomidine
Lofexidine, an α2A adrenergic receptor agonist.
Medetomidine, an α2 adrenergic agonist.

Nonspecific agonist 
Nonspecific agonists act as agonists at both alpha-1 and alpha-2 receptors.

 Xylometazoline
 Oxymetazoline
Apraclonidine
Cirazoline
Epinephrine

Undetermined/unsorted
The following agents are also listed as agonists by MeSH.
ergotamine
 etilefrine
 indanidine
mephentermine
 metaraminol
 methoxamine
 mivazerol
 naphazoline
 norfenefrine
 octopamine
 phenylpropanolamine
 propylhexedrine
 rilmenidine
 romifidine
 synephrine
 talipexole

Clinical significance
Alpha-adrenergic agonists, more specifically the auto receptors of alpha 2 neurons, are used in the treatment of glaucoma by decreasing the production of aqueous fluid by the ciliary bodies of the eye and also by increasing uveoscleral outflow. Medications such as clonidine and dexmedetomidine target pre-synaptic auto receptors, therefore leading to an overall decrease in norepinephrine which clinically can cause effects such as sedation, analgesia, lowering of blood pressure and bradycardia.  There is also low quality evidence that they can reduce shivering post operatively.

The reduction of the stress response caused by alpha 2 agonists were theorised to be beneficial peri operatively by reducing cardiac complications, however this has shown not to be clinically effective as there was no reduction in cardiac events or mortality but there was an increased incidence of hypotension and bradycardia.

See also

 Alpha blocker
 Adrenergic agonist
 Beta-adrenergic agonist

References

External links